Jordan John Young (born 31 July 1999) is a professional footballer who plays as a forward for Yeovil Town. He previously played in the Football League for Swindon Town. Born in England, Young has represented Scotland at youth level.

Club career
Young began his career at Swindon Town, joining the youth set up at the age of eight, and turned down the chance to join Chelsea's Academy in November 2011. He was called up to the Scotland under-15s in April 2014. He made his debut in the Football League on 2 February 2016, coming on for Jermaine Hylton 62 minutes into a 1–0 defeat to Port Vale at Vale Park. Young then made his home debut and scored his first professional goal in the last game of the 2015–16 season against Shrewsbury Town.

He spent the last two months of the 2018–19 season on loan at Highworth Town, scoring six goals from eight appearances in the Southern League Division One South, and was released by Swindon at its end.

On 16 August 2019, after a successful trial, Young signed a one-year contract with League One club Coventry City. He made his debut as an 86th-minute substitute in an EFL Trophy game v Southampton. This would be his one and only senior appearance for Coventry.

In December 2020, Jordan joined National League North side Gloucester City on a one-month loan deal.

On 12 May 2021 it was announced that he would leave Coventry at the end of the season, following the expiry of his contract.

Following his release from Coventry, Young returned to Gloucester City on a one-year deal.

Young joined Chippenham Town in February 2022, on an undisclosed fee from Gloucester, following a brief loan period 

On 12 January 2023, Young signed for National League side Yeovil Town for an undisclosed fee agreeing a two-and-a-half-year deal.

Career statistics

References

External links

1999 births
Living people
People from Chippenham
English footballers
Scottish footballers
Scotland youth international footballers
Association football midfielders
Swindon Town F.C. players
Highworth Town F.C. players
Coventry City F.C. players
Gloucester City A.F.C. players
Chippenham Town F.C. players
Yeovil Town F.C. players
English Football League players
Southern Football League players
National League (English football) players